Sonol Israel or Sonol, is an Israeli fuel provider and the country's third largest gas station chain. The company traces its roots back to 1917 and  Sonol has been indirectly controlled by the Azrieli Group since 2006.

History

1913–1947
The Standard Oil Company of New York (Socony) began oil exploration operations in Ottoman Palestine in 1913. It had been granted concessions by the Ottoman government to conduct geological surveys in order to ascertain whether oil was in existence in commercial quantities. After the war, when the territory of Palestine came under British administration, Socony complained to the U.S. State Department that the British government was refusing to allow the company to carry out research at its concessions. The State Department interceded with the British on Socony's behalf, and in December 1922 Socony completed its surveys. The surveys indicated that oil was not available in commercial quantities, after which Socony abandoned its concessionary claims and joined the Iraq Petroleum Company (IPC) in 1928.

Vacuum Oil Company began operating mechanical gas pumps in 1924. In 1931, Socony and Vacuum merged to form Socony-Vacuum Oil Company. By the 1940s, various transnational oil companies were operating in Mandatory Palestine, including IPC, Shell and Socony-Vacuum. IPC owned terminal facilities of the Kirkuk–Haifa pipeline; Shell jointly controlled the Haifa oil refinery with British Petroleum; and Socony-Vacuum maintained a local distributing agency accounting for 25–30% of the local oil market.

1948–1999
In the late 1940s, around the time Israel gained its independence, Socony-Vacuum made its pumps electric motor-driven. Saudi pressure in 1956 compelled Socony-Vacuum – which theretofore had been one of Israel's principal oil suppliers and which a year earlier had changed its name to Socony Mobil – to terminate its relationship with Israel and sell its interests there. In 1957 Socony Mobil's Israel operations were acquired by Rudolf Sonneborn and Sonol became the name of the company.

Sonol acquired gas distribution company Supergas in 1975. In 1981 Sonol was acquired by Granite Hacarmel Investments Ltd., one of the largest holding companies in Israel.

Since 2000 

Vulcan was sold in 2000 to Focus Capital Group Ltd. Sonol announced the establishment of its own chain of gas station convenience stores in 2004, following a similar trend set by rivals Paz, Delek and Dor Alon. By 2010 it was operating 140 such stores under the brand So Good.

The Antitrust Authority opposed the deal and in April 2006 filed an appeal with the Supreme Court. In June 2006 the Supreme Court ruled to suspend the Sonol deal.

In 2011 Sonol was one of four companies that together controlled 90% of the Israeli fuel market. In March Sonol and Better Place signed an agreement to deploy electric car battery recharging terminals at Sonol's gas stations. In October Sonol stations began offering gas containing an additive produced by Lubrizol Corporation shown in one study to reduce fumes and carbon dioxide emissions.

Notable tender wins

Israel's jet fuel market was opened up to competition in mid-1996.

In January 2012 Sonol won one of the largest-ever fuel tenders in Israel to supply diesel to Israel Railways in the central and southern regions of the country for three years.

Philanthropy
Sonol launched a nationwide campaign with the JDRF in 2005 to raise donations to help young sufferers of diabetes and further medical research. In 2007 Sonol launched a nationwide campaign to raise money for the nonprofit organization Larger Than Life, which strives to improve the lives of children and teenagers with cancer.

Criticism

Involvement in Israeli settlements

On 12 February 2020, the United Nations published a database of companies doing business related in the West Bank, including East Jerusalem, as well as in the occupied Golan Heights. Sonol was listed on the database on account of its activities in Israeli settlements in these occupied territories, which are considered illegal under international law.

See also
Brewster Jennings
Isaac Wolfson
ExxonMobil
List of automotive fuel brands
List of companies of Israel
Sonol gas station bombing

References

External links
Israel's Fuel Economy – Israel Ministry of Energy and Water Resources
ניר גלילי - The Board Directors of Sonol has approved the appointment of Nir Galili to CEO

Energy companies established in 1913
Filling stations in Israel
Oil and gas companies of Israel
Companies based in Netanya
Non-renewable resource companies established in 1913
Israeli brands
Retail companies established in 1913
1913 establishments in the Ottoman Empire